Pilpaküla may refer to several places in Estonia:

Pilpaküla, Hiiu County, village in Pühalepa Parish, Hiiu County
Pilpaküla, Tartu County, village in Vara Parish, Tartu County